Pro TV Internațional is a Romanian international television channel, owned by CME, which broadcasts the television programmes of Pro TV and its sister channels to Romanian audiences abroad in Romania, Moldova, Ukraine and Romania.

In 2018, at the time of the renewal of its license, 44% of its programming consisted of productions from Pro TV, 52% from Romanian third-party producers and the remaining 4% made specifically for the channel (the folk television program Acasă la români).

References

External links
 Pro TV

Pro TV
Television channels and stations established in 2000
Television stations in Romania